"U.O.E.N.O." (verbal shorthand for You Don't Even Know as spoken with a regional dialect) is a song by American hip hop recording artist Rocko. It was released on March 5, 2013, as the first single from his sixth mixtape Gift of Gab 2 (2013). The song, produced by Childish Major, features guest appearances from Future and Rick Ross. "U.O.E.N.O." peaked at number 20 on the US Billboard Hot 100, making it Rocko's highest-charting single as a lead artist, and also one of Future's & Rick Ross' most successful singles. It also managed to crack the Billboard Year-End in 2013.

Background
The song was originally released on February 15, 2013, as track 3 on Rocko's mixtape Gift of Gab 2.

Remixes
On April 11, 2013, the first remix of the song was released featuring Wiz Khalifa. On April 18, 2013, the second remix of the song was released featuring ASAP Rocky. On April 25, 2013, the third remix was released featuring 2 Chainz. On May 23, 2013, in anticipation of their tour together, Black Hippy released a remix of "U.O.E.N.O.". On September 1, 2013, Lil Wayne released another remix as a track on his mixtape Dedication 5.

Rick Ross controversy
In a line in the song, Rick Ross raps, "Put molly all in her champagne/ She ain't even know it/ I took her home and I enjoyed that/ She ain't even know it." A petition containing 72,000 signatures was presented to Reebok, demanding they drop Ross as a spokesman for the lyrics which appeared to condone date rape. Ross apologized for the lyrics, claiming they were not about rape. He was dropped by Reebok on April 11, 2013. A Ross concert organized by the student association of Carleton University was cancelled. Rocko later dropped the Rick Ross verse in order to have radio play. In the Black Hippy remix, Schoolboy Q raps: "Molly in her drink, but she asked me to and oh yeah I got this on cam".

Track listing
 Digital single

Chart performance

Weekly charts

Year-end charts

Certifications

Release history

References

2013 singles
2013 songs
Misogyny
Rocko (rapper) songs
Rick Ross songs
Obscenity controversies in music
Future (rapper) songs
Songs written by Rick Ross
Songs written by Future (rapper)